The Austrian Cricket Association (Österreichischer Cricket Verband) is the national governing body of cricket in Austria. It was founded in 1981 by Kerry Tattersall as the Austrian Cricketers Association, following the re-introduction of cricket to Austria in 1975 with the founding of Vienna Cricket Club – as 1. Vienna Cricket Verein. Cricket was recorded as being played in Vienna as far back as the 1890s, traditionally by gardeners of mercantile families. During the post-war occupation of Austria, cricket was also played by allied forces members. Since 2017, the Austrian Cricket Association has been an associate member of the International Cricket Council, and it is one of the founding members of the European Cricket Council. The European Cricket Council, now known as ICC Europe, is responsible for the administration of the ICC's European Development Program.

Executive committee
The executive committee of the ACA is elected every two years and usually consists of five elected members
all of which are volunteer workers.

Current executive committee

List of chairmen of the Austrian Cricket Association

List of secretaries of the Austrian Cricket Association

Member clubs
The association's members are 13 cricket clubs, each holding a single vote, with clubs having to be registered with the Austrian Vereinspolizei. Currently there are clubs from four of Austria's 9 federal provinces: Whilst the majority of clubs are based in Vienna, there are also clubs in Graz, Salzburg, Steyr and Velden.

List of current member clubs
 ASKÖ CC Steyr (ASCC)
 Austria Cricket Club Wien (ACC Wien)
 Austrian Cricket Tigers (ACT
 Austrian Daredevils Cricket Club (ADCC)
 Vienna Gladiators Cricket Club (VGCC)
 Bangladesh Cricket Club (BCC)
 Riders Cricket Club (RCC)
 Vienna Afghan Cricket Club (VACC)
 Cricket Club Velden '91 (CCV91)
 Five Continents Cricket Club (FCCC)
 Graz Cricket Club (GCC)
 Lords Cricket Club (LCC)
 Pakistan Cricket Club (PCC)
 Pakistan Falken Cricket Club (PFCC)
 Salzburg Cricket Club (SCC)
 Sri Lankan Cricket Club (SLCC)
 United Nations Cricket Club (UNCC)
Vienna Cricket Club (VCC)
 Vienna Lions Cricket Club (VLCC)

List of former member clubs
 Graz Cricket Club (GCC)
 Pakistan United Cricket Club (PUCC)
 Sri Lankan Sports Club (SLSC)
 St Pölten Cricket Club (SPCC)

Competitions organised
The Austrian Cricket Association is responsible amongst other duties for the administration of organised cricket competitions in Austria, with the ACA Open League perceived to be its premier competition. In 2008 the ACA Trophy, which had been a 40 over knockout tournament, and which had been geographically split since 2002 was replaced with a 20 overs competition, with a development remit.

ACA Open League
The ACA Open League is a single innings league, and in 2006 was split into two parallel conferences (Austrian Conference and National Conference) to allow more teams to enter the league. The top three teams of each conference qualified for the Super Sixes stage, with the top two contesting a final to decide the Open League Champions. Teams not qualifying for the Super Sixes stage played in localised plate competitions – the Viennese Plate and the Southern Plate.

The league is played as a 50 overs tournament, with the exception of 2009, where due to difficulties in scheduling the League due to the unavailability of Austria CC Wien's ground in the Markomannenstrasse, it has been necessary to reduce the competition to a 35 overs format to ensure that the competition can be played to a conclusion. In 2008 logistical issues had meant that the parallel conference system was in abeyance, with a regionalised structure (a Vienna group and a non-Vienna group) with a knock-out stage for the top 6 Viennese teams joined by the top 2 from the non-Vienna group. The 2008 Open League champions were Pakistan CC, retaining the title they had won in 2007.

The first winners of the Open League since its split into parallel conferences was Vienna Lions CC in 2006, defeating Five Continents CC in the final played in September 2006 in Seebarn. United Nations CC won the Viennese Plate competition, with CC Velden '91 winning the Southern Plate competition.

ACA Open League Champions and Runners-up 1991–2018

Champions:

8: Concordia CC/Austria CC Wien
7: Pakistan CC
4: Lords CC
2: Vienna CC
1: Pakistan Falken CC, Vienna Lions CC, Pakistan Cricket Wien

ACA Trophy
Pakistan CC were the last winners of the ACA Trophy (North), in 2007, defeating reigning ACA Trophy (North) holders Vienna Lions CC in the final in Seebarn. Vienna Lions CC had won the 2006 ACA Trophy (North). The competition was split into two tournaments (North and South) in 2002, with Salzburg CC having dominated the ACA Trophy (South).

ACA Trophy Champions and Runners-Up

ACA Twenty20 tournament
The inaugural Twenty20 tournament was contested by five teams in Vienna in 2008, with Pakistan CC defeating Pakistan Falken CC in the final to become champions. In 2009, United Nations CC defeated the reigning champions to win the second Twenty20 tournament, contested by six clubs. In 2010 the tournament was contested by 7 teams. In 2011 the competition split into two groups due to demand for the competition, although in 2012 the nine teams in the tournament played in a single group again. A plate competition was introduced to ensure extra cricket for sides eliminated in the group stage of the competition.

ACA Twenty20 Champions 2008–present

Austrian national team
The Austrian national team is open to players who are qualified to play for Austria under the International Cricket Council's qualification criteria and fulfil a nationality and development criteria. The Austrian national team made its competitive début in 1990 in Guernsey and played regularly until 2003. In 2006 the national team was revived, playing two international matches against the Czech Republic.

The team's return to competitive cricket was to ICC Europe's European Championships Division 4, held in Cyprus in September 2009, with the team finishing third after wins against Luxembourg, Cyprus, Slovenia and Finland and a loss against Switzerland.

See also
List of International Cricket Council Members
:Cricket in Austria

References

External links
Official website
Cricket in Austria Trailer on YouTube

Cricket
Cricket administration
Cricket in Austria
Sports organizations established in 1981